Shamili Sounderajan, known professionally as Varshini Sounderajan, is an Indian actress, model, and television presenter who appears in Telugu films. She made her acting debut in anthology film Chandamama Kathalu (2014).

Early life and career
Varshini Sounderajan was born in Hyderabad to a Tamil family. She completed her bachelor's degree in Electronics. 
She started her career as a model. She made her film debut Chandamama Kathalu (2014) which won National Film Award for Best Feature Film in Telugu. 
She is known for her performance in the Telugu films Lovers, Kai Raja Kai and Sri Rama Raksha.
She played the lead in Viu's web series Pelli Gola alongside Abijeet, presented by Annapurna Studios. The series was successful and she went onto star in two more seasons.
She acted as a team leader in the TV show Dhee. Varshini has been listed in the first edition of Hyderabad Times Most Desirable Woman on Television 2017. She is also appeared as an anchor in the TV show Pataas 2.
In 2022, she starred in a Telugu film Malli Modalaindi along side telugu actor Sumanth.The film received positive response for Varshini's performance.
Varshini also hosted a popular Telugu television show Comedy Stars on Star Maa.

She is part of the film Shaakuntalam directed by Gunasekhar. While she is restricted in giving out the details about her role, Varshini, who’s already begun shooting for her part, offers that her role in the film has multiple get-ups.
In 2018 she also hosted the popular Telegu television comedy show Jabardast for a day on 15 November.

Filmography

 All films are in Telugu, unless otherwise noted

Films

Television

References

External links 

 
 

Indian film actresses
Living people
Year of birth missing (living people)
Tamil people
Telugu television anchors